Ctenoplusia chillagoes is a moth of the family Noctuidae. It is found in Queensland.

Some authors consider it to be a subspecies of Ctenoplusia placida.

External links
Australian Faunal Directory

Moths of Australia
Plusiinae
Moths described in 1900